Hakai Magazine in an online magazine which publishes short and feature-length journalistic stories on topics related to coastal science, ecology and communities. It was established by the Hakai Institute in 2015, which is funded by the Tula Foundation. The magazine is headquartered in Victoria, British Columbia, Canada. The founding editor of the magazine is science journalist, Jude Isabella. The magazine also publishes film and book reviews.

Contributors 
Regular contributors to Hakai magazine include

 Brian Owens,
 Heather Pringle,
 Darcy Dobell,
 Zach Zorich,
 Elizabeth Preston,
 Ilima Loomis,
 Hannah Waters,
 Michael Allen,
 Steve De Neef,
 Gord More,
 Jason G. Goldman,
 Larry Pynn and others.

Occasional contributors include
 Ryan Schuessler,
 James Thomson,
 Sheryl McFarlane,
 Jessica Wynne Lockhart,
 Eli Kintisch,
 Geoffrey Giller,
 Briony Penn,
Cameron Walker,
 Anne Finkbeiner, 
 Anne Casselman,
 Alexandra Ossola,
 John H. Tibbets,
 Isabelle Groc,
 Steven Ashley,
 Andrew Lawler,
 Lorraine Boissoneault and others.

References

Environmental magazines
Science and technology magazines published in Canada
Online magazines published in Canada
Magazines established in 2015
Magazines published in British Columbia
2015 establishments in British Columbia
Mass media in Victoria, British Columbia